Campo Lindo  (Beautiful Field, in English) is a neighborhood of Seropédica, Brazil. The road BR-465 passes at proximity, and the Guandu river flows near.

Geography of Rio de Janeiro (state)
Neighbourhoods in Rio de Janeiro (state)